Ben Rhydding Hockey Club is a field hockey club that is based at Coutances Way in Ben Rhydding, Ilkley, West Yorkshire. The club was founded in 1901.

The club runs five women's teams  with the first XI playing in the Women's England Hockey League Division One North  and five men's teams  with the first XI playing in the Men's North Hockey League.

Notable players

Women's internationals

Men's internationals

References

English field hockey clubs
1901 establishments in England
Sport in West Yorkshire